Robot is a series of books containing the art of various Asian artists, created by Range Murata and published by Wanimagazine. Volume 1 was released on October 21, 2004, and ten volumes have currently been released.

Digital Manga Publishing was originally responsible for the North American distribution, with the first volume being released August 6, 2005. However, due to talks over publishing negotiations breaking down, DMP stopped publishing Robot after Volume 3. Rights were picked up by UDON Entertainment who began distribution on December 24, 2007 with Volume 4, with the plan of releasing all subsequent releases on a quarterly basis, but has since halted after releasing volume 5.

Artists involved

Keith Seifert
Hiroyuki Asada
Yoshitoshi ABe
Mami Itō
Inuburo
Kouji Ogata
Okama
Yū Kinutani
Yūsuke Kozaki
Sabe
Kei Sanbe
Shou Tajima
Hakekyo Tashiro
Yumi Tada
Range Murata
Chicken
Teikoku Shōnen
Dowman Sayman
Kei Tōme
Tokiya
Shin Nagasawa
Hanaharu Naruko
Mii Nekoi
Pinfen
Kazumasa Hirai
Jirō Kuwata
Kamui Fujiwara
Eizō Hōden
Shigeki Maeshima
Hirotaka Maeda
Yasuto Miura
Mitsukazu Mihara
Michio Murakawa
Suzuhito Yasuda
Yamato Yamamoto
YUG
Kengo Yonekura
Roboinu
Rco Wada
Kawayō
Osamu Kobayashi
Makoto Kobayashi
Haccan
Jun Fuji
Miggy
Enomoto
Hyung-tae Kim
Shuzilow Ha
D.K
Ugetsu Hakua
BABYsue

Figures
Various characters from the first volume were made into a figure collection . Figures included were:

Groundpass Drive by Range Murata
...of the Planetarium by Sho-U Tajima
Pez and Hot Strawberry by Hiroyuki Asada
Dragon Fly by Shigeki Maeshima
Ebony and Ivory by Suzuhito Yasuda
Eventyr by Haccan

Reception

In Jason Thompson's addendum to Manga: The Complete Guide, he describes it as "an original dôjinshi with fabulous production values".

References

External links
 Udon Entertainment's Robot English Website

2004 manga
Digital Manga Publishing titles
Hentai anime and manga
Romantic comedy anime and manga
Seinen manga
Wanimagazine manga